Torqueola is a genus of moths of the family Crambidae described by Charles Swinhoe in 1906.

Species
Torqueola hypolampra Turner, 1915
Torqueola monophaes (Lower, 1902)
Torqueola ophiceralis (Walker, 1866)

References

Spilomelinae
Crambidae genera
Taxa named by Charles Swinhoe